The name Utagawa may refer to:

The Utagawa school of Japanese woodblock print artists
One of the artists of the Utagawa school, including:

, also known as Andō Hiroshige
, also known as Utagawa Toyokuni III

, Japanese ornithologist and academic
, Japanese scholar of Western Studies

Japanese-language surnames